Pavúk (Slovak feminine: Pavúková) or Pavuk is a surname which means spider in several Slavic languages. Notable people with the surname include:
Daniel Pavúk (born 1998), Slovak footballer
František Pavúk (born 1993), Slovak football defender
Viktória Pavuk (born 1985), Hungarian figure skater

See also
 

Slovak-language surnames